Sir Laurence Stoughton (1554–1615), of Stoughton, Surrey and West Stoke, Sussex, was an English politician.

He was the son of Thomas Stoughton, MP and the brother of MP, Adrian Stoughton and educated at the Inner Temple. He inherited his father's estates in 1576.

Career
He was a Member (MP) of the Parliament of England for Guildford in 1572, 1584, 1586 and 1593. He was knighted by King James in 1611.

Family
He married Rose, the stepdaughter of Guildford MP, William Hammond and had 11 sons and 6 daughters. Two of his sons, George Stoughton and Nicholas Stoughton, were also MPs for Guildford.

References

1554 births
1615 deaths
People from Surrey
Members of the Inner Temple
English MPs 1572–1583
English MPs 1584–1585
English MPs 1586–1587
English MPs 1593
Members of Parliament for Guildford
Knights Bachelor